Strongest Man of the Netherlands is an annual strongman competition held in the Netherlands and featuring exclusively Dutch athletes. The contest was established in 1979, with Gerard Du Prie winning the inaugural contest. Berend Veneberg and Jarno Hams hold the record for most wins with 7. Ted van der Parre holds 3 wins, and Ab Wolders and Gerard Du Prie each have 2 wins in the contest.

Jarno Hams lost in 2014 for the first time in ten years and became 4th. There were some years he did not participate, but he was the undisputed champion. In 2015, the 7-time champion wanted to try one last time to become the only man to win 8 times, but Hams got injured just before the match, so another man took his place in the event.

Top 3 placings

Results courtesy of David Horne's World of Grip: http://www.davidhorne-gripmaster.com/strongmanresults.html

Notes
According to the results of realdutchpower the event was held in 1997 and not held in 1998.

References

National strongmen competitions
Sports competitions in the Netherlands
1979 establishments in the Netherlands
Recurring sporting events established in 1979